Hora ot naroda is the fifth and final album by Bulgarian rock band Hipodil. Released on 4 December 2000, the album had guest vocalists due to bandleader Svetoslav Vitkov moving to the US to find work, so they recruited vocalists for some tracks from other Bulgarian rock bands (most notably Petar Stanoev and Nikolai Yordanov from Kontrol). Other tracks on the album were sung by keyboardist Ventsislav Mitsov, who was deputised to the bandleader position while Vitkov was in America. Vitkov himself had already recorded lead vocal tracks for the tracks "Drugo nyama" and "Partizani", and appears as a backing vocalist in "Choveche". Despite Vitkov's absence from most of the album, he is still referenced on the cover - a photo of him from the S gol v rukata... era is used as part of a fictional wanted poster on the cover, asking for 13 million lev for his capture, and a photo of him from the Alkoholen delirium era was inserted into the band photo on the inside of the booklet.

Vitkov later returned to Bulgaria, rejoined the group and released the band's final release in 2002, the EP Hipodil.

The track "Zidaromazachi" was written in 1988 and performed with the original Miroslav Tellalov-fronted lineup until 1991.

Track list

Personnel

Hipodil 
 Vencislav Mitsov - vocals, keyboards
 Petar Todorov - guitar, backing vocals
 Vencislav Lozanov - bass, backing vocals
 Luchezar Marinov - drums, backing vocals

Special guests 
 Nikolai Yordanov - vocals (track 7)
 Svetoslav Vitkov - vocals (tracks 2 and 9)
 Emil Trifonov - vocals (track 8)
 Petar Stanoev - vocals (tracks 5 and 12)

External links 
 Hora ot naroda at Discogs

2000 albums
Hipodil albums